Ruben Maria Soriquez (born August 2, 1971) is a Filipino Italian film actor, director and producer.

Personal life
Soriquez was born on August 2, 1971. His father was a Filipino while his mother is an Italian. Soriquez settled down in Philippines in 2013 together with his wife, Lanie Martin Gumarang and their children.

Education
Soriquez graduated from the University of Bologna with a degree in Human Resources. He also took a filmmaking course organised by the New York Film Academy in Florence in 2007 and studied script-writing and editing in New York. He obtained a diploma in acting at Colli Theatre School in 2008.

Career

2011-2013: Debut in Italy

After making his directorial debut with the documentary Montovolo: History, Nature and Legend  in 2011, Soriquez directed Sexocracy: The Man of Bunga Bunga , a documentary feature film based on an interview with Lele Mora and was released in May 2012. It received a nomination for Best Documentary at the 2012 New York City International Film Festival.

In 2013, He directed The Broken Crown, a coproduction of Italy, Germany, and the Philippines, which starred Andrea Roncato , Tony Sperandeo , Horst Janson , Massimo Bonetti , Manuela Morabito, and Ron Williams.

2013-2019: Acting and Directing in the Philippines

Ruben moved to the Philippines in late 2013, where he founded See Thru Pictures, Inc., a film production and distribution company. With See Thru Pictures, Soriquez produced in 2015 the movie Of Sinners and Saints. Acting alongside him were Raymond Bagatsing, Polo Ravales, Richard Quan, and Althea Vega. For his lead role in that movie, Soriquez won Best Actor in the 2015 World Premieres Film Festival He got his first television drama role in Dolce Amore in 2016, playing Roberto Marchesa, the adoptive father of Liza Soberano's character, Serena. In 2017, he appeared in two Star Cinema films: Can't help falling in love starring Daniel Padilla and Kathrine Bernardo and Unexpectedly Yours  starring Robin Padilla and Sharon Cuneta. in 2019, Ruben Maria Soriquez returned to the small screen with the action TV series The General's Daughter, playing the role of weapons smuggler David Pascal .

2007-2021: as Producer 
Since 2007, Soriquez has produced several titles among which feature films and TV movies , (like the horror films: Arachnicide and Dead Gamers both directed by Italian director Paolo Bertola). He is one of the few contemporary filmmakers to produce and direct silent films (A Perfect Family  and The Silent Killer  the latter scored by Italian composer Franco Eco ) to be premiered at the International Silent Film Festival Manila. On May 7, TubiTV releases his controversial documentary film Pandemiocracy

Debut in the International TV scene 
In 2018, Soriquez joined the cast of the TV series General Commander, starring Steven Seagal, with the role of the mafioso Santino Amato. In the following year, 4 films in which he stars (Of Sinners and Saints, The Spiders' Man , The Lease and Entrapped) were released in the US.

Representing Italy through Films 
Ruben Maria Soriquez is at present (2015-2018) a Board Member of the ICCPI Italian Chamber of Commerce in The Philippines Inc., promoting the Culture of Italy in South East Asia especially in The Philippines. In 2017, with the ICCPI, the  Dante Alighieri Society of Manila and the Embassy of Italy in Manila, he founded The Venice Film Festival in Manila, an Italian Film Festival that screened in Manila a selection of Italian Films of the Venice Film Festival 2016. The festival changed its name to "Italian Cinema: from Venice to Manila" for the 2018 edition where Italian films from the Venice Film Festival 2017 were screened. In 2016 his film Of Sinners and Saints represented Italy together with the film My Friends (film) of Mario Monicelli at the 19th Cine Europa in Manila. In 2017 his contemporary Silent film A Perfect Family  represented Italy at the 11th International Silent Film Festival Manila  and his 2020 silent film The Silent Killer  was one of the two Italian entries to the 14th International Silent Film Festival Manila

EPIFF European Philippine International Film Festival 
Ruben Maria Soriquez founded the European Philippine International Film Festival EPIFF in 2017 with Maurizio Baldini e Lorenzo Galanti. The first two editions of EPIFF took place in Florence, Italy on March 7, 8 2018  and May 2019, while the 2020 and 2021 editions took place online  due to the COVID-19 pandemic. The 4th edition (2021)  has been partnered by See Thru Pictures, Film Philippines Incentives, FDCP, NCCA , Sentro Rizal . Among the film showcased also Milan (2004 film) produced my Philippines' largest network ABSCBN.

Filmography

Films

Television

Accolades

References

External links
See Thru Pictures Official Website

Ruben Maria Soriquez on Cinema Italiano
Ruben Maria Soriquez on MyMovies
Ruben Maria Soriquez on Amazon Prime 
Ruben Maria Soriquez on TubiTV

1971 births
Living people
Italian people of Filipino descent
Film people from Bologna